Timbung Pokhari is a natural fresh water lake located at an elevation of 4335 m in Sidingwa Rural Municipality in  the Taplejung district of Nepal. The name Timbung means firing of gun in local Limbu language. The name was given to the pond because it often makes a gunfire sound. The lake is about 466 m long and 154 m wide.

The lake is visited by Hindu and Buddhist pilgrims from Nepal and India, mainly in the month of Shrawan (July–August) and during festivals like Janai Purnima and Naga Panchami. Locals believe that wishes of pilgrims come true by visiting the lake.

The lake can be reached by about two days on foot from Chyangthapu.

The perfect time to visit the Timbung Pokhari is between March – October and in Mid-July – August. In this period of time, sight seekers get a chance to explore the natural biodiversity, scenic view of Mt. Kanchenjunga and Pokhari itself in a more close-up look.

See also
List of lakes of Nepal

References

Lakes of Nepal
Lakes of Koshi Province